Radford, also known as Radfordsville, or Richardson Store, is an unincorporated community in Perry County, Alabama, United States.

History
Radford is named for the family of William Radford, who settled in the area circa 1820. A post office operated under the name Radfordsville from 1846 to 1906.

References

Unincorporated communities in Perry County, Alabama
Unincorporated communities in Alabama